Danionella translucida is an extremely small (1.1 cm long) species of cyprinid fish endemic to Myanmar. When described, it was considered to be one of the smallest fish. It was collected from the roots of floating aquatic plants in a slow-flowing, shallow stream (maximum depth 1 m) in the Pegu Division of Myanmar. It was found alongside Danio, Microrasbora, Erethistes, and Oryzias species. Observed in life, D. translucida is almost perfectly transparent except for its eyes. It has a distinctive pattern of melanophores. There are no melanophores on the dorsal surface except on the head over the posterior part of the brain. On the posterior half of the body, there a few melanophores following the horizontal midline. The sides and underside of the abdomen have melanophores. A double row of melanophores is present on the underside of the fish from the isthmus of the gills to the pelvic fins. Females carried anywhere from 3 to 8 or 10 eggs. Compared to the body of the fish, these eggs are relatively large.

References

External links
 Danionella translucida

translucida
Endemic fauna of Myanmar
Fish of Myanmar
Fish described in 1986
Taxa named by Tyson R. Roberts